Arthur is a village in, and the county seat of Arthur County, Nebraska, United States. The population was 117 at the 2010 census.

History
Arthur was founded in 1913 to be the seat of Arthur County, then just organizing. The town and county were both named for President Chester A. Arthur. Arthur was incorporated as a village in 1944.  The first county office was a covered wagon, with a one-room courthouse being built in 1915.  A year before that, in the Spring, a general store was constructed, and afterward a newspaper, the first church and the post office were established. A one-room highschool was also built in 1914, expanding to two rooms in 1920.  In 1916 the Arthur State Bank was founded.  Into the 1920s, Arthur continued to be built. The town got electricity in 1926, though most of the county would not have it until the early 1950s.

Then in 1932, the Great Depression struck Arthur, closing its bank, which was not replaced until 1939 with the Arthur County Co-op Credit Association.  Following WWII, in 1950 construction of a new, large and modern highschool was completed.  A new courthouse was built in 1960-1961.  In 1980, the census population was 125.

Historic sites
Two sites in Arthur are listed in the National Register of Historic Places.  The Pilgrim Holiness Church was built in 1928 out of straw bales, in response to the region's dearth of trees or construction sod.  The First Arthur County Courthouse and Jail complex was built in 1914-15; the courthouse is billed as the smallest ever built in the United States.  Both sites are now maintained by the Arthur County Historical Society.

Geography
Arthur is located at  (41.572244, −101.690738), in the Nebraska Sandhills.

Climate
Arthur has a borderline humid continental climate (Köppen Dfa/Dwa) just wet enough to avoid being classed as a cool semi-arid climate (BSk). In contrast, 18.2 mornings below  can be expected each winter, alongside 176.5 mornings below freezing and 38.6 afternoons that do not top freezing.

Spring warms up steadily but erratically: although the first afternoon over  can be expected on March 13, the last morning below freezing is not expected until May 14, and the first fall morning below freezing can be expected on September 26, giving a frost-free season of only 134 days. During dry spells with the upper subtropical ridge is pushed northwards, heatwaves and droughts can occur:  was recorded during the infamous 1936 heat wave, when Arthur averaged  as monthly maximum; in contrast, the wet month of July 1958 had an average maximum of only .

Demographics

2010 census
As of the census of 2010, there were 117 people, 61 households, and 35 families residing in the village. The racial makeup of the village was 99.1% White and 0.9% Asian.

There were 61 households, of which 23.0% had children under the age of 18 living with them, 42.6% were married couples living together, 13.1% had a female householder with no husband present, 1.6% had a male householder with no wife present, and 42.6% were non-families. 42.6% of all households were made up of individuals, and 23% had someone living alone who was 65 years of age or older. The average household size was 1.92 and the average family size was 2.60.

The median age in the village was 52.5 years. 20.5% of residents were under the age of 18; 3.4% were between the ages of 18 and 24; 13.7% were from 25 to 44; 34.2% were from 45 to 64; and 28.2% were 65 years of age or older. The gender makeup of the village was 51.3% male and 48.7% female.

2000 census
As of the census of 2000, there were 145 people, 62 households, and 43 families residing in the village. The population density was 460.5 people per square mile (180.6/km2). There were 88 housing units at an average density of 279.5 per square mile (109.6/km2). The racial makeup of the village was 97.93% White, 0.69% Native American, 0.69% Asian, 0.69% from other races. Hispanic or Latino of any race were 2.07% of the population.

There were 62 households, out of which 29.0% had children under the age of 18 living with them, 53.2% were married couples living together, 12.9% had a female householder with no husband present, and 30.6% were non-families. 27.4% of all households were made up of individuals, and 16.1% had someone living alone who was 65 years of age or older. The average household size was 2.34 and the average family size was 2.84.

In the village, the population was spread out, with 25.5% under the age of 18, 2.8% from 18 to 24, 31.0% from 25 to 44, 23.4% from 45 to 64, and 17.2% who were 65 years of age or older. The median age was 41 years. For every 100 females, there were 79.0 males. For every 100 females age 18 and over, there were 86.2 males.

The median income for a household in the village was $24,821, and the median income for a family was $31,458. Males had a median income of $25,417 versus $15,625 for females. The per capita income for the village was $15,196. There were 13.7% of families and 18.4% of the population living below the poverty line, including 20.8% of under eighteens and none of those over 64.

Transportation
The Arthur Municipal Airport is located about one mile (about a kilometer and a half) southwest of Arthur's central business district.  The runways are unpaved.  The airport handles about 25 operations per year.

References

External links
 Arthur County High School
 Nebraska Life Article

Villages in Arthur County, Nebraska
Villages in Nebraska
County seats in Nebraska